Zığ (also, Zykh) is a municipality in Baku, Azerbaijan. It has a population of 5,755.

References 

Populated places in Baku